Bruce Fink is an American Lacanian psychoanalyst and a major translator of Jacques Lacan. He is the author of numerous books on Lacan and Lacanian psychoanalysis, prominent among which are Lacan to the Letter: Reading Écrits Closely, The Lacanian Subject: Between Language and Jouissance (1995), Lacan on Love: An Exploration of Lacan's Seminar VIII and A Clinical Introduction to Lacanian Psychoanalysis: Theory and Technique.

Education and work 
After completing a college scholar program, and graduating from Cornell University in 1976, Fink completed his graduate work abroad at the University of Paris, VIII. Among Fink's mentors at Paris VIII was the preeminent philosopher and Lacanian psychoanalyst Alain Badiou, who supervised his M.A. thesis in philosophy. Fink completed his Ph.D. in psychoanalysis in 1987, defending a dissertation on the work of Lacan. After graduating Fink was admitted to the psychoanalytic formation program of the École de la Cause freudienne, an institute of the French Psychoanalytic Institute. While a student at Paris VIII Fink attended "Orientation lacanienne" seminar given by Jacques-Alain Miller, the foremost interpreter of Lacan and at the time the head of Ecole de la Cause Freudienne (School of Freudian Cause). 

Fink is the author of several books and dozens of peer-reviewed articles on Lacan and Lacanian clinical methods, and is one of the most widely read Lacanian analysts in the English-speaking world. His translation of Lacan's Écrits is considered the standard edition. In addition to translating several of Lacan's later seminars, since 1986 he has presented his theoretical and clinical work at nearly a hundred different conferences, psychoanalytic institutes, and universities in the U.S. and abroad.

Bibliography 
AUTHORED (English)
A Clinical Introduction to Freud: Techniques for Everyday Practice (W. W. Norton, 2017).
Lacan on Love: An Exploration of Lacan's Seminar VIII, Transference (Routledge, 2016).
The Purloined Love: An Inspector Canal Mystery (Karnac Books, 2014).
Odor di Murderer, Scent of a Killer: An Adventure from Inspector Canal's New York Agency (Karnac Books, 2014).
Against Understanding, Volume 1: Commentary and Critique in a Lacanian Key (Routledge, 2014).
 Against Understanding, Volume 2: Cases and Commentary in a Lacanian Key (Routledge, 2014).
Death by Analysis: Another Adventure from Inspector Canal’s New York Agency (Karnac Books, 2013).
 The Psychoanalytic Adventures of Inspector Canal (Karnac Books, 2010).
 Fundamentals of Psychoanalytic Technique: A Lacanian Approach for Practitioners (New York: W.W. Norton, 2007).
 Lacan To The Letter: Reading Ecrits Closely (Saint Paul: University of Minnesota Press, 2004).
A Clinical Introduction to Lacanian Psychoanalysis: Theory and Technique (Cambridge: Harvard University Press, 1997).
 The Lacanian Subject: Between Language and Jouissance (Princeton: Princeton University Press, 1995).

EDITED COLLECTIONS:
 Reading Seminar XX: Lacan's Major Work on Love, Knowledge, and Feminine Sexuality, eds. Bruce Fink, Richard Feldstein, and Maire Jaanus. Albany: SUNY Press, 2002
 Reading Seminars I and II: Lacan's Return to Freud, eds. Bruce Fink, Richard Feldstein, and Maire Jaanus. Albany: SUNY Press, 1996
 Reading Seminar XI: Lacan's Four Fundamental Concepts of Psychoanalysis with the first English translation of "Position of the Unconscious", eds. Bruce Fink and Suzanne Barnard. Albany: SUNY Press, 1995
 
ARTICLES:
 La médicalisation de la psychologie américaine, L'âne. Le magazine freudien 29, 1986
 Critique de "Jewish Origins of the Psychoanalytic Movement", Ornicar? 41, 1987
 Critique de "Reading Lacan", Ornicar? 41
 Qu'est-ce que la séduction?, L'âne. Le magazine freudien 31
 Notes on Temporal Tension, Newsletter of the Freudian Field 2, 1988
The Seminar of Jacques Lacan: A Critical Review, Literature and Psychology 36, 1990
 Alienation and Separation: Logical Moments of Lacan's Dialectic of Desire, Newsletter of the Freudian Field 4
 There's No Such Thing as a Sexual Relationship: Existence and the Formulas of Sexuation, Newsletter of the Freudian Field 5, 1991
 The Lacanian Subject, Analysis 3
 The Subject as Metaphor, Newsletter of the Freudian Field 5
 "Ni spolnega razmerja." Eksistenca in formule seksuacije, translation into Slovenian of Bruce Fink's work on feminine sexuality. in Filozofija skoz Psihoanalizo VII. collection edited by Slavoj Zizek, Ljubljana, Analecta, p. 225-59, 1993
 Tommy, the Anatomy of a Trauma, Lacanian Ink 10, 1995
 The Real Cause of Repetition, a chapter in Reading Seminar XI: Lacan's Four Fundamental Concepts of Psychoanalysis, eds. Bruce Fink, Richard Feldstein, and Maire Jaanus. Albany: SUNY Press, p. 223-9
 Science and Psychoanalysis, a chapter in Reading Seminar XI: Lacan's Four Fundamental Concepts of Psychoanalysis, eds. Bruce Fink, Richard Feldstein, and Maire Jaanus. Albany: SUNY Press, p. 55-64
 Alain Badiou, UMBR(a) 1, 1996
 Reading Hamlet with Lacan, Lacan, Politics, Aesthetics, eds. Richard Feldstein and Willy Apollon. Albany: SUNY Press, p. 181-98
 The Analytic Relationship, Looking at Lacan, eds. Kareen Malone and Stephen Friedlander. Albany: SUNY Press, 1999
 Knowledge and Science: Fantasies of the Whole, Lacan and Science, eds. Jason Glynos and Yannis Stavrakakis. London: Rebus Press
 The Ethics of Psychoanalysis, The Psychoanalytic Review 86, 4; 529-45
 The Four Discourses, Key Concepts of Lacanian Psychoanalysis, ed. Danny Nobus, London: Rebus Press
 Psychoanalytic Approaches to Severe Pathology: A Lacanian Perspective, Newsletter of the International Federation for Psychoanalytic education, 2001
 Interview of Bruce Fink by Miles Smit, Leuven Philosophy Newsletter vol. XI, 2003
 Interview of Bruce Fink by Dan Warner, Journal of Lacanian Studies vol. XI
 The Use of Lacanian Psychoanalysis in a case of Fetishism, Clinical Case Studies II 1
 Lacan in Translation, Journal for Lacanian Studies 3, 2004
 Lacanian Clinical Practice, The Psychoanalytical Review vol. 92, 4, 2005
 Freud and Lacan on Love: A Preliminary Exploration, Acta Philosophica-Filozofski vestnik Ljubljana, Slovenian Institute of Philosophy, 2006
 Lacan on Personality from the 1930s to the 1950s, Journal of European Psychoanalysis 26/27, 2008
 Lacan'in Temel Frntazi Kavramina Bir Giris, MonoKL, 2009
 Bruce Fink ile Soylesi, MonoKL
 Against Understanding: Why Understanding Should Not Be Viewed as an Essential Aim of Psychanalytic Treatment, Journal of the American Psychoanalytic Association 58/2, 2010
 Analysand and Analyst in the Global Economy, New Formations, 2011
 What's So Different about Lacan's Approach to Psychoanalysis, The Psychoanalytical Review
 Love and the Real, Sexual Identity and the Unconscious, Comments on Rolf Flor's Case Presentation, Lacan and Addiction: An Anthology

TRANSLATIONS:
 Jacques Lacan: Logical Time and the Assertion of Anticipated Certainty, Newsletter of the Freudian Field 2, 1988
 Alain Badiou: On a Finally Objectless Subject, Topoi 7. ed. Jean-Luc Nancy, Kluwer Academic Publishers, 1988
 Jacques Lacan: Science and Truth, Newsletter of the Freudian Field 3, 1989
 Jacques-Alain Miller. Microscopia: An Introduction to the Reading of Television, Television: A Challenge to the Psychoanalytic Establishment. New York: W.W. Norton & Co., 1990
 Jacques Lacan: Metaphor of the Subject, Newsletter of the Freudian Field 5, 1991
 Jacques Lacan: The Seminar, Book XX, Encore, On Feminine Sexuality: The Limits of Love and Knowledge (1972-1973), New York: W.W. Norton, 1998
 Écrits: A Selection by Jacques Lacan, New York: W.W. Norton, 2002
 Écrits: The First Complete Edition in English by Jacques Lacan, New York: W.W. Norton, 2006
 Jacques Lacan: The Triumph of Religion, Cambridge: Polity, 2013
 Jacques Lacan: The Names-of-the-Father, Cambridge: Polity
 Jacques Lacan: The Seminar, Book VIII, Transference, Cambridge: Polity, 2015
 Colette Soler: Lacanian Affects: The Function of Affect in Lacan's Work, London: Routledge

References

External links 
 Interview with Freud Museum
 Research article published on his work in the journal Filozofski Vestnik 
 Interview with him in the journal Contemporary Psychoanalysis

American psychoanalysts
Critical theorists
Living people
Year of birth missing (living people)